Belgium–Russia relations are the bilateral foreign relations between the two countries, Belgium and Russia. Russia has an embassy in Brussels and a consulate-general in Antwerp, whilst Belgium has an embassy in Moscow and a Consulate General in Saint Petersburg.

Both countries are full members of the Council of Europe and the Organization for Security and Co-operation in Europe. The former country has good relations with the latter.

History

High level contacts between Belgium and Russia began in the early 18th century, when Peter the Great visited the Southern Netherlands in 1717. Amongst towns he visited were Brussels and Spa. Peter left his mark in Spa, when he built an edifice with a portico over the main spring, which the locals renamed in his honour as Pouhon Pierre-le-Grand. Diplomatic relations were established between Belgium and the Russian Empire in 1853, when Mikhail Irineyevich Khreptovich was appointed as the first envoy of the Russian Empire in Brussels on 19 March 1853.

Trade relations
In 2004, trade between the two countries totalled €4.75 billion, an increase of €1.18 billion over the previous year, with Russia holding a trade surplus of €1.51 billion in bilateral trade. Russian exports to Belgium were mainly commodities, including minerals (37%), precious and semi-precious stones (22%), ferrous and non-ferrous metals (17%) and chemical products (8%). Russian imports from Belgium were composed of industrial equipment (25%), chemicals and pharmaceuticals (18%), plastic products and rubber (9%), food (8%) and transportation (8%). In 2004, Belgium imported 30% of its oil and natural gas from Russia, although mainly spot market. Air transport links between the two countries exist, with Aeroflot and Brussels Airlines operating flights between Moscow and Brussels.

After the 2022 Russian invasion of Ukraine started, Belgium, as one of the EU countries, imposed sanctions on Russia, and Russia added all EU countries to the list of "unfriendly nations".

See also

Foreign relations of Belgium
Foreign relations of Russia
Russians in Belgium

References

Further reading

External links

 Embassy of Belgium in Moscow
Embassy of the Russian Federation in Brussels
Consulate-General of the Russian Federation in Antwerp

 
Russia
Bilateral relations of Russia